Bounkani Region is one of the 31 regions of Ivory Coast. Since its establishment in 2011, it has been one of two regions in Zanzan District. The seat of the region is Bouna and the region's population in the 2021 census was 427,037.

Bounkani is currently divided into four departments: Bouna, Doropo, Nassian, and Téhini.

Just over half of Bounkani (11 090 km²) is located in Comoé National Park. The portion of Bounkani that is within the park is not governed by any department.

Notes

 
Regions of Zanzan District
States and territories established in 2011
2011 establishments in Ivory Coast